Superstar is the fourth studio album by American singer-songwriter Caroline Rose. It was released on March 6, 2020 under New West Records.

Chart performance
Superstar opened at No. 20 on the US Heatseekers Albums chart with 3,000 units.

Critical reception
Superstar received positive reviews from critics. At Metacritic, which assigns a weighted average rating out of 100 to reviews from mainstream publications, this release received an average score of 81, based on 14 reviews.

Track listing

Charts

References

2020 albums
New West Records albums
Caroline Rose albums